Dancing with an Angel is a studio album by American singer-songwriter Rita Coolidge. Released on July 21, 1991 by Attic Records in Canada and Japan, it consists mainly of English-language covers of popular J-pop songs.

The album peaked at No. 16 on Oricon's albums chart.

Track listing
All English lyrics are written by Priscilla Coolidge, except track 4.

Personnel
 Rita Coolidge – vocals
 Dean Parks, Fred Tackett – guitar
 Bill Sharpe – bass
 Mike Utley – piano, keyboards, organ
 Tom Keane – synthesizer
 John Robinson, Thom Mooney – drums
 Michael Fisher – percussion
 Brandon Fields – saxophone
 Arnold McCuller, David Lasley, Fred White, JoAnn Harris, Luther Waters, Priscilla Coolidge, Rosemary Butler – background vocals

Charts

References

External links
 
 

Rita Coolidge albums
1991 albums
Attic Records albums
Covers albums